The 31st World Cup season began in October 1996 in Sölden, Austria, and concluded in March 1997 in the United States at the World Cup finals at Vail, Colorado.  The overall winners were Luc  Alphand of France and Pernilla Wiberg of Sweden, the only championship for each.

Alphand, who won by just 34 points, became the first male French overall winner in 29 years, since Jean-Claude Killy in 1968.  After his overall victory, as well as discipline titles in both downhill (his third straight) and super-G (the only two events in which Alphand competed during the season), Alphand retired from international competition.  Five-time overall World Cup champion Marc Girardelli of Luxembourg also retired during the season after suffering another knee injury during a race in December 1996.

A break in the schedule was for the World Championships, held 3–15 February in Sestriere, northwestern Italy.

Calendar

Men

Ladies

Men

Overall

Downhill

Super G

Giant Slalom

Slalom

Combined

Ladies

Overall

Downhill

Super G

Giant Slalom

Slalom

Combined

References

External links
 FIS-ski.com - World Cup standings - 1997

1996–97
World Cup
World Cup